Events from the year 1932 in Michigan.

Office holders

State office holders

 Governor of Michigan: Wilber M. Brucker (Republican)
 Lieutenant Governor of Michigan: Luren D. Dickinson (Republican)
 Michigan Attorney General: Paul W. Voorhies
 Michigan Secretary of State: Frank D. Fitzgerald
 Speaker of the Michigan House of Representatives: Fred R. Ming
 Chief Justice, Michigan Supreme Court:

Mayors of major cities

 Mayor of Detroit: Frank Murphy (Democrat)
 Mayor of Grand Rapids: John D. Karel
 Mayor of Flint: William H. McKeighan
 Mayor of Lansing: Peter F. Gray
 Mayor of Ann Arbor: H. Wirt Newkirk

Federal office holders

 U.S. Senator from Michigan: James J. Couzens (Republican)
 U.S. Senator from Michigan: Arthur Vandenberg (Republican) 
 House District 1: Robert H. Clancy (Democrat)
 House District 2: Earl C. Michener (Republican)
 House District 3: Joseph L. Hooper (Republican)
 House District 4: John C. Ketcham (Republican)
 House District 5: Carl E. Mapes (Republican)
 House District 6: Seymour H. Person (Republican)
 House District 7: Jesse P. Wolcott (Republican)
 House District 8: Michael J. Hart (Democrat)
 House District 9: James C. McLaughlin (Republican)
 House District 10: Roy O. Woodruff (Republican)
 House District 11: Frank P. Bohn (Democrat)
 House District 12: W. Frank James (Republican)
 House District 13: Clarence J. McLeod (Republican)

Population

Sports

Baseball

 1932 Detroit Tigers season – Under manager Bucky Harris, the Tigers compiled a 76-75 record and finished in fifth place in the American League. The team's statistical leaders included Gee Walker with a .323 batting average, Charlie Gehringer with 19 home runs, John Stone with 109 RBIs, Earl Whitehill with 16 wins, and Tommy Bridges with a 3.36 earned run average.
 1932 Michigan Wolverines baseball season - Under head coach Ray Fisher, the Wolverines compiled a 19–15–1 record. Art Superko was the team captain.

American football

 1932 Michigan Wolverines football team – Under head coach Harry Kipke, the Wolverines compiled a perfect 8–0 record, tied for the Big Ten Conference championship, and were selected as national champions under the Dickinson System. Quarterback Harry Newman was a consensus first-team All-American and also won the Chicago Tribune Silver Football as the most valuable player in the Big Ten. Chuck Bernard and Ted Petoskey were also selected as first-team All-Americans by some selectors. 
 1932 Michigan State Spartans football team – Under head coach Jim Crowley, the Spartans compiled a 7–1 record.
 1932 Western State Hilltoppers football team - Under head coach Mike Gary, the Hilltoppers compiled a 6–0–1 record.
 1932 Detroit Titans football team – The Titans compiled an 8–2 record under head coach Gus Dorais.
 1932 Michigan State Normal Hurons football team - Under head coach Elton Rynearson, the Hurons compiled a 5–2 record.
 1932 Central State Bearcats football team - Under head coach George Van Bibber the Bercats compiled a 3–4–1 record.
 1932 Detroit City College Tartars football team – The Tartars compiled a 1–6 record under head coach Joe Gembis.

Basketball
 1931–32 Western Michigan Broncos men's basketball team – Under head coach Buck Read, the Broncos compiled a 14–5 record.
 1931–32 Michigan State Spartans men's basketball team – Under head coach Benjamin Van Alstyne, the Spartans compiled a 12–5 record.
 1931–32 Michigan Wolverines men's basketball team – Under head coach Franklin Cappon, the Wolverines compiled an 11–6 record. 
 1931–32 City College of Detroit (CCD) men's basketball team – Under coach Newman Ertell, CCD (later known as Wayne State) compiled an 11–6 record.
 1931–32 Detroit Titans men's basketball team – Under head coach Lloyd Brazil, the Titans compiled an 8–8 record.

Ice hockey
 1931–32 Detroit Falcons season – Under coach Jack Adams, the Falcons compiled an 18–20–10 record, finished in third place in the National Hockey League (NHL) American Division, and lost in the playoff quarter-finals to the Montreal Maroons. Ebbie Goodfellow led the team with 14 goals, 16 assists, and 30 points. Alec Connell was the team's goaltender. 
 1931–32 Michigan Wolverines men's ice hockey team – Under head coach Ed Lowrey, the Wolverines compiled a 9–6–2 record.
 1931–32 Michigan Tech Huskies men's ice hockey team – Under head coach Bert Noblet, the Huskies compiled a 6–5–2 record.

Other
 Port Huron to Mackinac Boat Race – 
 Michigan Open -

Chronology of events

January

February

March
 March 7 - Ford Hunger March, a demonstration of unemployed workers starting in Detroit and ending in Dearborn that resulted in four workers being shot to death by the Dearborn Police Department and security guards employed by the Ford Motor Company

April

May

June

July

August

September

October

November

December

Births
 May 26 - Joe Altobelli, Major League Baseball manager (1977-1991), in Detroit
 June 13 - Charles W. Misner, physicist and co-author of Gravitation, in Jackson, Michigan
 December 15 - Curtis Fuller, jazz trombonist in Detroit. 
 December 19 - Carl Pursell, U.S. Congressman (1977-1993), in Imlay City, Michigan

Gallery of 1932 births

Deaths
 January 8 - Joseph W. Fordney, U.S. Congressman (1899-1923), at age 78 in Saginaw, Michigan
 October 11 - William Alden Smith, United States Senator (1907-1919), United States Representative (1895-1907), at age 73 in Grand Rapids
 October 18 - William E. Upjohn, founder of Upjohn Pharmaceuticals, at age 79

Gallery of 1932 deaths

See also
 History of Michigan
 History of Detroit

References